William Cameron "Cam" Weaver (born June 10, 1983) is a retired American soccer player.

Career

High school and college
Weaver attended Kentwood High School in Covington, Washington, and played four years of college soccer at Skagit Valley College and Seattle University.

Weaver also played for the Kalamazoo Kingdom in the USL Premier Development League.

Professional
Weaver signed for the Seattle Sounders of the USL First Division in 2006. He became the league's co-leading scorer in his rookie season, a title he shared with Brazilian legend Romario of Miami FC. The scoring title earned him international recognition, and Weaver subsequently signed a three-year contract with Norwegian club Haugesund, for whom he subsequently scored 21 goals in 51 Adeccoligaen appearances.

In February 2009, Weaver joined the San Jose Earthquakes of Major League Soccer. On June 9, 2009, the Earthquakes traded Weaver to Houston Dynamo in exchange for forward Chris Wondolowski and a conditional pick in the 2010 MLS draft.  He notched his first assist for the Dynamo in his first game with them on June 10, 2009, against Chivas USA.  Three days later he scored for the first time with the Dynamo with a brace against FC Dallas to lead the team to a 3-1 win.

Cam signed to the Seattle Sounders FC in March 2014. He had three first team appearances. His option was declined for 2015.

On March 8, 2015, Weaver announced his retirement from professional soccer.

Honors

Individual
USL First Division Top Scorer: 2006

References

External links

 

1983 births
Living people
American soccer players
American expatriate soccer players
Seattle Redhawks men's soccer players
Kalamazoo Kingdom players
Seattle Sounders (1994–2008) players
FK Haugesund players
San Jose Earthquakes players
Houston Dynamo FC players
Seattle Sounders FC players
Kentwood High School (Washington) alumni
Seattle University alumni
Sportspeople from Kent, Washington
Soccer players from Washington (state)
Expatriate footballers in Norway
USL League Two players
USL First Division players
Norwegian First Division players
Major League Soccer players
Association football forwards